This article is about the demographics of Cincinnati, Ohio.

2020 census

Note: the US Census treats Hispanic/Latino as an ethnic category. This table excludes Latinos from the racial categories and assigns them to a separate category. Hispanics/Latinos can be of any race.

2010 census

As of the census of 2010, there were 296,943 people, 133,420 households, and 62,319 families residing in the city. The racial makeup of the city was 49.3% White, 45.0% African American, 0.3% Native American, 1.8% Asian, 0.1% Pacific Islander, 1.2% from other races, and 2.5% from two or more races. Hispanic or Latino of any race were 2.8% of the population.

There were 133,420 households, of which 25.4% had children under the age of 18 living with them, 23.2% were married couples living together, 19.1% had a female householder with no husband present, 4.4% had a male householder with no wife present, and 53.3% were non-families. 43.4% of all households were made up of individuals, and 9.9% had someone living alone who was 65 years of age or older. The average household size was 2.12 and the average family size was 3.00.

The median age in the city was 32.5 years. 22.1% of residents were under the age of 18; 14.6% were between the ages of 18 and 24; 28.4% were from 25 to 44; 24.1% were from 45 to 64; and 10.8% were 65 years of age or older. The gender makeup of the city was 48.0% male and 52.0% female.

2000 census

As of the census of 2000, there were 331,285 people, 148,095 households, and 72,566 families residing in the city. The racial makeup of the city was 52.97% White, 42.92% African American, 0.21% Native American, 1.55% Asian, 0.04% Pacific Islander, 0.63% from other races, and 1.68% from two or more races. Hispanic or Latinos of any race were 1.28% of the population. The top 4 largest ancestries include German (19.8%), Irish (10.4%), English (5.4%), Italian (3.5%).

There were 148,095 households, out of which 25.1% had children under the age of 18 living with them, 26.6% were married couples living together, 18.6% had a female householder with no husband present, and 51.0% were non-families. 42.8% of all households were made up of individuals, and 11.1% had someone living alone who was 65 years of age or older. The average household size was 2.15 and the average family size was 3.02.

In the city the population was spread out, with 24.5% under 18, 12.9% from 18 to 24, 31.6% from 25 to 44, 18.7% from 45 to 64, and 12.3% who were 65 or older. The median age was 32 years. For every 100 females, there were 89.4 males. For every 100 females age 18 and over, there were 85.6 males.

The median income for a household in the city was $29,493, and the median income for a family was $37,543. Males had a median income of $33,063 versus $26,946 for females. The per capita income for the city was $19,962. About 18.2% of families and 21.9% of the population were below the poverty line, including 32.0% of those under age 18 and 14.8% of those age 65 or over.

References

Cincinnati
Cincinnati